Marjorie Siksi'naaq Tutannuaq (1917-1989) was an Inuit artist who lived in Baker Lake, Nunavut (in the Northwest Territories during her lifetime).

Her work is included in the collections of the National Gallery of Canada and the Winnipeg Art Gallery. 

Her daughter, Elizabeth Kugmucheak Alooq (born 1943), is a Baker Lake artist who creates drawings and prints.

References

1917 births
1989 deaths
20th-century Canadian artists
20th-century Canadian women artists
Inuit artists